St Stephen's Girls' College (SSGC) is a grant school in Hong Kong under the Hong Kong Sheng Kung Hui (Anglican Church). Established in 1906, SSGC is a top girls' school and among the oldest schools in Hong Kong. It is managed by the St. Stephen's Girls' College School Council.

History 
The school first opened in 1906. The first principal was Miss Carden. Originally on Caine Road, the school moved to its current location at Lyttelton Road, Mid-Levels, in 1923. It has a history of voluntary social service and involvement in charitable work going back to 1920.

In 2001, the school was one of a group of "traditional élite schools" criticised by the then Secretary of Education and Manpower Fanny Law for what she saw as reliance on rote teaching. Staff from the school defended it.

School buildings
The Main Building of St. Stephen's Girls' College has been listed as a declared monuments of Hong Kong since 1992.

Notable alumni 

 Rita Fan
 Regina Ip
 Ellen Li
 Sandra Ng
 Winnie Yu
 Xian Yuqing

References

Further reading
 Change and Continuity: a history of St. Stephen's Girls' College, Hong Kong, 1906-1996, by Kathleen E Barker (Chinese University Press, 1996)

External links 

St. Stephen's Girls' College website

Protestant secondary schools in Hong Kong
Girls' schools in Hong Kong
Educational institutions established in 1906
Anglican schools in Hong Kong
Declared monuments of Hong Kong
Sai Ying Pun
1906 establishments in Hong Kong